The Israeli Combat Engineering Corps (Heil HaHandasa HaKravit) is the combat engineering forces of the Israel Defense Forces.

The Combat Engineering Corps beret's color is silver and its symbol features a sword on a defensive tower with an explosion halo on the background. The Combat Engineering Corps mottos are "Always First" (ראשונים תמיד Rishonim Tamid) and the unofficial "The hard, we shall do today; the impossible, we shall do tomorrow".

Its roles include mobility assurance, road breaching, defense and fortifications, counter-mobility of enemy forces, construction and destruction under fire, sabotage, explosives, bomb disposal, counter-weapons of mass destruction (NBC) and special engineering missions.

In addition to Combat Engineering Corps sappers, each infantry brigade has an engineering company trained with basic engineering and explosive ordnance disposal (EOD) skills (called פלח"הן). Combat Engineering Corps sappers and heavy equipment operators are often attached to other units (such as armored or infantry brigades) in order to help them breach through obstacles and handle explosive threats.

Roles 
Beside extensive training in basic combat engineering, combat engineers receive specialized training in their respective professions. These are:
 Sapper: trained with all the basic engineering skills and also trained at high infantry level (רובאי 07). Their main role is to breach through terrain obstacles (natural and artificial), breach through minefields and enable ground forces to advance in the battlefield. They are trained to supply close combat support for both armored fighting vehicles and infantry. Some of them are trained in driving the Combat Engineering Corps standard CEV: the IDF Puma.  They professional ranks after advanced training are Rifleman 07 (רובאי 07) and Sapper 06 (פלס 06).

 Engineering Vehicles Operator (EVO): less combatant but nonetheless important, these soldiers are skilled in the operation of heavy mechanical equipment and engineering vehicles such as heavy bulldozers, excavators, cranes, tractors and mine-breaching devices. EVO units are called צמ"ה (Tzama) in Hebrew, acronym of Tziyud Mechani Handasi (Mechanical Engineering Equipment). They professional ranks are Rifleman 05 (רובאי 05) and EVO Operator 07 (מפעיל צמ"ה 07).
 Bulldozer Operators: belong to the EVO, these soldiers are operating the IDF Caterpillar D9 armored bulldozers, including under heavy fire. Their roles are versatile and differ according to the units to which they are attached. The D9 operators perform construction, destruction, breaching and EOD missions while assisting tanks, infantry and even special forces during battle.
 NBC Disposal: called "purifiers", they are expert in handling nuclear, biological and chemical threats.
 EOD experts: the EOD are experts in nondestructive detonation of explosives and bomb disposal. Among their equipment are the Barrett M82A1 and remote-control EOD robots with shotguns and mechanical arms. The EOD are the military equivalent of the police's bomb squad. In the IDF, they are a part of the elite Engineering unit Yahalom.
 Demolition experts: they are specially trained in blowing up targets in the most accurate and effective way. They explode targets ranging from cellular phones and doorlocks up to tanks and large buildings. In the IDF, the demolition experts are united in Sayeret Yael of Yahalom (Sayeret is the Hebrew term for a SF elite unit) and therefore gain high infantry training as well.
 Fortification experts: assigned to designing and overseeing the construction of bases, outposts, bridges and fortifications. Construction itself is usually done by the EVOs.
 Counter-Tunnels experts: established in 2003 by the late Captain Aviv Hakani, these Combat Engineering Corps soldiers are experts in finding smuggling tunnels and weapon caches, and demolishing them. They operated in Rafah during the al-Aqsa Intifada and received recommendation of honor for their activity. After 2004 APC incident the Rafah tunnel team was united with the Combat Engineering Corps elite unit Yahalom and was renamed Sayeret Samur ("Samur" means "Weasel" in Hebrew).

Units 

 Combat Engineering Battalions
  Asaf 601 אסף
  HaMachatz 605 המחץ
  Lahav 603 להב
 Reserve Battalions
 Command's Engineering Units
 North
 Center
 South
 Special Engineering Vehicles (TZAMA צמ"ה) units
 Knights of Steel אבירי הפלדה – Tzama Gaza South
 Steel Cats חתולי הפלדה – Tzama Gaza North
 Wild Cats  חתולי הבר – Tzama Yeuda and Shomron
 Beit Hilel בית הלל – Tzama North
 Cliffs Cats, Tzama Sdira – חתולי הצוקים, צמ"ה סדירה
 Yahalom – special engineering unit 
 Sayeret Yael – engineering commando
 SAP – EOD and bomb disposal
 SAMUR – counter-tunnels
 Hevzek – Robotics
 Military Engineering School (Bahalatz 14) – "Tzukey Uvda" – "בית הספר להנדסה צבאית – בהל"צ 14 – "צוקי עובדה
 Counter-NBC and purifiers (closed and transferred to (Home Front Command)
 Counter-NBC battalion 76
 Yanshuf – NBC training center

Equipment

Personal gear 
The Israeli combat engineers and sappers are combat soldiers and therefore have a personal gear and weapons as infantry soldiers. Their issued rifle is the M-16A1 (short 13/14-inch barrel) and M4 Carbine. Other weapons include hand grenades, M203 grenade launcher, IMI Negev, FN MAG and M2 Browning machineguns and M24 SWS and Barret M82A1 sniper rifles.

Vehicles 

The combat engineering soldiers are mobilized by APCs and armored 4×4 vehicles.
The Armoured personnel carriers include the Centurion tank-based IDF Puma, a heavy combat engineering vehicle equipped with engineering devices such as mine plows. Reserve forces use the old and versatile M113 APC. In 2016 the 603rd Combat Engineering Battalion ("Lahav") started to receive IDF Namer Combat engineering vehicle based on the Namer APC.

Wheeled armored vehicles include the HMMWV ("Hummer"), Wolf Armoured Vehicle and M240 Sufa.

Heavy equipment 
The Combat Engineering Corps operates heavy equipment and engineering vehicles (called TZAMA in Hebrew) such as armored bulldozers, armored excavators, armored wheeled loaders, armored backhoe loaders and more. The best known tool is the heavily armored IDF Caterpillar D9 bulldozer.

Mine breaching devices 
The Combat Engineering Corps has different means to breach fast through mine fields. These include personal sapper gear, vehicle-mounted mine plows and mine rollers which can be attached to engineering vehicles and tanks, CARPET air-fuel rockets and the "Tzefa Shiryon" (Hebrew for "Armor's Viper") which is extremely powerful and can clear large mine fields.

Explosives 
The Combat Engineering Corps has a wide range of explosives, demolition charges and different land mines.

Robots 
Yahalom SF Unit operates many types of robots, including bomb disposal robots, reconnaissance robots and remote-controlled heavy equipment (such as "Raam HaShachar" D9N bulldozer, and the "Front-Runner" mini-cat loader).

NBC 
Counter-NBC soldiers are equipped with protective suits and gas masks, chemical ID systems and purification vehicles.

Gallery

History

Founding 
The Combat Engineering Corps has a record of professional achievement and decoration. Its best known operation is the bridging of the Suez Canal during the Yom Kippur War.
The corps was formed from the sabotage unit of the Palmach and the tractor operators units of the 1947–1949 Palestine war. In its early years, the Combat Engineering Corps drew its soldiers mainly from Jews who had served in the United Kingdom's Royal Engineers.

ICEC chief engineer, Brigadier General David Leskov (not to be confused with Chief Engineering Officer קצין הנדסה ראשי, the commander of the ICEC), developed many combat engineering systems for the Israel Defense Forces, and won three Israel Security Prizes. He served in the IDF until his death at the age of 86, thus being the oldest soldier in the world.

In Israel's wars 
In the 1947–1949 Palestine war, the Combat Engineering Corps blasted bridges over the Jordan River and the streams of the southern Coastal plain in order to stop the advance of the Arab armored forces into the Israeli civilian rear. The Combat Engineering Corps also helped in breaching the "Burma Road" into besieged Jerusalem.

In the 1956 Sinai war, the Combat Engineering Corps destroyed Egyptian military infrastructure in the Sinai Peninsula and was awarded with a battalion recommendation of honor.

In the 1967 Six-Day War the Combat Engineering Corps stormed Jordanian fortifications along the walls of the Old City of Jerusalem. After Israel annexed the Old City, the Combat Engineering Corps removed landmines planted in the city by the Jordanians. This was the first war in which Caterpillar D9 bulldozers were employed by the corps.

After the war, the Combat Engineering Corps helped to build a fortification line of defense along the Suez Canal and were awarded the Israel Security Prize in 1969. The Israeli Engineering Corps were the first corps to win the award.

In the 1973 Yom Kippur War the combat engineering battalions attached to Ariel Sharon's armored division bridged the Suez Canal during "Operation Knights of Heart", while carrying tanks and paratroopers across the canal with Gillois amphibious tank-carriers. This effort enabled Sharon and Avraham "Bren" Adan's armored divisions to cross the canal and surround the 3rd Egyptian Army, forcing it to surrender. The bridging of the canal is regarded by many as the turning point of the war on the southern front. On the northern front, a Combat Engineering Corps Caterpillar D9 bulldozer was the first ever motorized vehicle to reach the summit of the Hermon.

In Operation Peace for Galilee the Combat Engineering Corps worked intensively to open routes for Israeli forces.  Their duties also included the disarming landmines and Improvised explosive devices as well as building fortifications and outposts.

In the 1991 Gulf War, the NBC purifiers of the Combat Engineering Corps were on a "code red" alert for disarming Iraqi Scud missiles, armed with non-conventional warheads.

The October 2000 Lebanon abduction 

On 7 October 2000 three Israeli combat engineering soldiers were abducted by Hezbollah from the Shebaa Farms, in the Golan Heights.  The soldiers, Beni Avraham, Adi Avitan and Omar Sawaed, suffered fatal injuries during their abduction. Their bodies were retrieved in 2004 in a prisoner swap with Hezbollah.

A series of accusations were made against the United Nations Interim Force in Lebanon (UNIFIL) by press and partisan web sites for having cooperated with the abduction. Those accusations stem from a video, whose existence was originally denied by UN officials, recorded by Indian peacekeepers one day after the abduction. The video, which the UN agreed to provide to Israeli officials in June 2001 with civilian faces blurred, showed abandoned vehicles with fake UN license plates and uniforms, and Hezbollah supporters intercepting UN efforts to retrieve the vehicles. A UN investigation found no evidence to support accusations of peacekeepers involvement in the abduction. Although the bereaved families met with Kofi Annan, they refused to accept the UN version. In September 2004, the bereaved families announced their intention to sue the UN, Hezbollah, Iran, Syria and Lebanon for their parts in the abduction.

The Second Intifada 
For further discussions see: al-Aqsa Intifada, IDF Caterpillar D9, Operation Defensive Shield, Battle of Jenin 2002, Operation Rainbow.

During the al-Aqsa Intifada, which erupted in September 2000, the Combat Engineering Corps were employed to disarm many Palestinian IED explosive charges and booby traps. In many cases, the Combat Engineering EOD operators, together with Israeli Police bomb disposal operators, also detonated explosive belts captured on Palestinian suicide bombers. The Combat Engineering Corps also dynamited Palestinian houses, bomb labs and smuggling tunnels.

However, the Combat Engineering Corps were most known for operating the armored IDF Caterpillar D9 armored bulldozers, which are cited by many Israelis and military experts as a key factor in keeping IDF casualties low and successfully fighting terrorism. On the other side, for Palestinians, the bulldozers became a nightmare, as they bulldozed many Palestinian buildings and shrubbery, and were almost impervious to Palestinian attacks. The Combat Engineering Corps bulldozers' operators unit received a recommendation of honor for its activity in Jenin during Operation Defensive Shield.

Armored bulldozers were also massively employed in Rafah to counter terrorist smuggling tunnels. Human Rights Watch published a report criticizing the extensive destruction of Palestinian houses in the southern Gaza strip, and said it was unlawful, claiming that Israel uses the Palestinian smuggling tunnels as a pretext to create a "buffer zone" along the Gaza-Egypt border. In Rafah, the Combat Engineering Corps formed a special unit, designated for searching and destroying smuggling tunnels, it is called SAMUR and now belongs to Yaalom. They also received an honor of recommendation, for their conduct. Until the Gaza Disengagement plan, the Combat Engineering 603 battalion's reconnaissance platoon (מחס"ר) held a record of over 70 terrorists killed in 2004–2005 on the border between the Gaza Strip and Israel. They received a recommendation of honor for this achievement.

Second Lebanon War 
The Combat Engineering Corps took significant part in the Second Lebanon War that erupted in 2006 after Hizbullah attacked IDF patrol, abducted two soldiers and killed another 8 with anti-tank missiles and improvised explosive devices that hit the rescuers.

On 16 July combat engineering forces from Asaf battalion were the first to enter Lebanon. Their mission was to clear improvised explosive devices, open safe routes to ground forces and demolish Hizbullah infrastructures. Yahalom bomb disposal experts and IDF Caterpillar D9 bulldozers cleared most of Hizbullah's IEDs. During the war, a D9 went over a 500 kg belly charge improvised explosive devices but survived without taking significant damage.

During the war, combat engineers used bulldozers and explosives to destroy Hezbollah outposts, bunkers, warehouses and HQs—mainly along the border. The works intensified as the war reached near end, and indeed the borderline was cleared in time.

Combat engineers also rescued damaged tanks, often under fire.

Two combat engineers were awarded with Medal of Distinguished Service and other two awarded a recommendation of honor from the General Chief of Staff. Many other awarded with recommendation of honor from less senior commanders.

Operation Cast Lead 

During the Gaza War (2008–2009) codenamed "Operation Cast Lead" by the IDF, combat engineering forces were the first to enter the Gaza Strip to clear IEDs, booby traps and open safe routes to armor and infantry.

Many booby traps, rigged structures and tunnels were present in the Gaza Strip as part of Hamas efforts to prepare to the Gaza War. These were often concealed in civilian structures, and were even found in schools and mosques. However, most of the Palestinian booby traps were successfully countered by the IDF Combat Engineering Corps bomb disposal experts (part of Yahalom Special Engineering Unit) which dismentaled the bombs and armored D9 bulldozers which detonated bombs and booby traps while sustaining no damage from the explosions. IDF Caterpillar D9R and unmanned "Raam HaShachar" D9N armored bulldozers which opened route in dangerous areas have taken many improvised explosive devices, landmines, explosive charges and RPG hits, but no crewmen were killed. However, a Yahalom bomb disposal expert was killed after entering a house and encountering a suicide bomber. He was the only fatality of the Combat Engineering Corps during the war.

Besides neutralizing Hamas IEDs and traps, combat engineering forces demolished Hamas infrastructure and other structures used as outposts, shooting positions, traps, cover for tunnels, HQs and warehouses. The head officer of the Combat Engineering Corps (קהנ"ר) estimated that about 600 buildings were bulldozed or exploded by his troops.

The Combat Engineering Corps' success heightened their reputation within the IDF and in the Israeli public. This was manifested in increased number of conscripts who chose the Combat Engineering Corps as their first priority in their draft preferation questionnaire ("Manila מנילה"—a form in which the conscript chooses in what unit he would like to serve, the IDF tries to fulfill his request as much as possible).

Operation Protective Edge 

During Operation Protective Edge (July–August 2014) Combat Engineers played a major role in destroying Hamas' cross-border underground infiltration tunnels. The tunnels were exposed and cleared by armored bulldozers and excavators, and then detonated by Yahalom's Samoor unit. In total, about 32 tunnels were destroyed. In addition, combat engineers participated in the battles, neutralized Hamas-planted improvised explosive devices, cleared booby-traps, opened routes for armor and infantry, and destroyed terrorist infrastructure. Six combat engineers were killed during the battles in the Gaza Strip.

Operation Northern Shield 

In late 2018 the IDF commenced Operation Northern Shield to detect, located and destroy Hezbollah tunnels dug into northern Israel from South Lebanon. The combat engineering corps played the major role in the operation, operating on ground and below it, deploying Yahalom tunnel warfare teams and heavy equipment. As for 12 January 2019, the IDF discovered 6 tunnels.

References

External links 

 Combat Engineering Corps, IDF official website (English)
 Official website by "Palas" – Combat Engineers Association (Hebrew)
 Combat Engineering page  – IDF's Ground Command website (Hebrew)
 Combat Engineering Corps – Israel Defense Forces YouTube channel, 2011
 Captain Aviv Hakani

 
Military engineer corps
Military units and formations established in 1947